The  is a professional wrestling six-man tag team championship owned by the All Japan Pro Wrestling (AJPW) promotion. The championship was introduced on December 13, 2020, when Black Menso-re, Carbell Ito and Takao Omori defeated Daimonji So, Revlon and Ryouji Sai to become the inaugural champions.

Like most professional wrestling championships, the title is won as a result of a scripted match. There have been a total of five reigns shared between four different teams consisting of nine distinctive champions. The current champions are Takao Omori, Black Menso-re and ATM who are in their second reign as a team.

Title history

Combined reigns

By wrestler

See also
NWA World Six-Man Tag Team Championship
WAR World Six-Man Tag Team Championship
NEVER Openweight Six-Man Tag Team Championship
Open the Triangle Gate Championship
Yokohama Shopping Street 6-Man Tag Team Championship

References

External links 
 All Japan Pro Wrestling's official website

All Japan Pro Wrestling championships
Trios wrestling tag team championships